Drepanodontus is a genus of sea snails, marine gastropod mollusks in the family Buccinidae.

Species
Species within the genus Drepanodontus include:

 Drepanodontus tatyanae Harasewych & Kantor, 2004

References

Buccinidae
Monotypic gastropod genera